The Journal of the British Astronomical Association is a peer-reviewed scientific journal of astronomy published by the British Astronomical Association since October 1890. It is currently edited by Philip Jennings and publishes original research articles, as well as news items relevant to the association and the proceedings of association meetings. Letters to the editor, book reviews, and obituaries are also published.

Abstracting and indexing
The journal is indexed and abstracted in the following databases:

Editors
Edward Walter Maunder 1890-1894
Annie Scott Dill Russell 1894-1896
Edward Walter Maunder 1896-1900
Frederick William Levander 1900-1916
Annie Scott Dill Maunder 1917-1930
Peter Doig 1930-1937
R. M. Fry 1937-1946
Francis John Sellers 1941-1946 (acting)
John Leslie Haughton 1946-1948
Peter Doig 1948-1952
Neville Goodman 1952-1960
D. G. Hinds 1960-1963
Frank Hyde 1963-1965
Colin Ronan 1965-1985
Nigel Henbest 1985-1987
Jacqueline Mitton 1987-1993
Hazel McGee 1994-2018
Philip Jennings 2018-date

References

External links
 Journal of the British Astronomical Association website
 British Astronomical Association website

Astronomy journals
English-language journals
Bimonthly journals
Publications established in 1890
Academic journals published by learned and professional societies of the United Kingdom